Andrew or Andy Harvey may refer to:
Andy Harvey, American baseball player
Andrew Harvey (journalist) (born 1944), British journalist
Andrew Harvey (religious writer) (born 1952), author, religious scholar and teacher of mystic traditions
Andrew Harvey (politician), Canadian politician
Andrew Harvey (fictional character), character in The Ambassador's Daughter